Myroides is a bacterial genus from the family of Flavobacteriaceae. Some Myroides species such as Myroides odoratimimus can cause infections in humans.

References

Further reading 
 
 

Flavobacteria
Bacteria genera